The Shakespeare Baronetcy, of Lakenham in the City of Norwich, is a title in the Baronetage of the United Kingdom. It was created in 1942 for the Liberal politician Geoffrey Shakespeare. The third and current Baronet is a geneticist and sociologist.

The Shakespeare baronets descend from Richard Shakespeare, the grandfather of the playwright William Shakespeare.

Shakespeare baronets of Lakenham (1942)
Sir Geoffrey Hithersay Shakespeare, 1st Baronet (1893–1980)
Sir William Geoffrey Shakespeare, 2nd Baronet (1927–1996). Shakespeare was a highly respected general practitioner who practised at the Bedgrove Health Centre in Aylesbury. He had achondroplasia. He inherited the baronetcy in 1980 on the death of his father. The title passed to the eldest of his children, Tom Shakespeare, on his death in 1996.
Sir Thomas William "Tom" Shakespeare, 3rd Baronet (born 1966)

See also
 Shakespeare coat of arms

References

Kidd, Charles, Williamson, David (editors). Debrett's Peerage and Baronetage (1990 edition). New York: St Martin's Press, 1990.

Shakespeare
Shakespeare family